The Indian War of Independence may refer to 
Indian Rebellion of 1857
The Indian War of Independence (book)- a 1909 nationalist history of the 1857 rebellion.
India's First War of Independence (term) - is a term predominantly  used in India to describe the Indian Rebellion of 1857.
Indian independence movement